Talbina is a porridge made from barley flour, formed by adding milk and honey to the dried barley powder. The name comes from the Arabic word  meaning yogurt (fermented churned milk), because of its resemblance to yogurt, as it is soft and white.

Nutrition
Barley is a good source of insoluble and soluble dietary fiber. The soluble fiber portion contains the richest source of beta-glucans compared to any other grain; these can aid immune function. Barley also contains B vitamins, iron, magnesium, zinc, phosphorus, and copper, and is one of the richest sources of chromium, which is important in maintaining blood glucose levels. Barley is also rich in antioxidants and contains a high concentration of tocols and tocotrienols, oils that help reduce the risk of cancer and heart disease. Barley has been cited as a possible food to increase tryptophan, and thus serotonin in the body.

Cultural significance
Ibn Sina, in his 11th century work The Canon of Medicine, wrote of the healing effects of barley water, soup and broth for fevers. Additionally, barley can be roasted and turned into roasted barley tea, a popular Asian drink.

See also 
 Tsampa

References

External links 

 A Brief History of Barley Foods

Middle Eastern cuisine